Mirny (masculine), Mirnaya (feminine), or Mirnoye (neuter) may refer to:

People 
 Max Mirnyi (Mirny) (b. 1977), Belarusian tennis player

Fictional characters 
 Mirny, a character in Alpha Scorpio, an Australian children's sci-fi series

Places 
 Mirny Urban Okrug, a municipal formation which the town of oblast significance of Mirny, Arkhangelsk Oblast, Russia is incorporated as
 Mirny Urban Settlement, several municipal urban settlements in Russia
 Mirny, Russia (Mirnaya, Mirnoye), several inhabited localities in Russia
Mirny, Maykopsky District, Republic of Adygea
 Myrnyi (Mirny), an urban-type settlement in Crimea
 Mirny Airport, an airport in the Sakha Republic, Russia
 Mirnyy Peak (Mirny), a peak in the north of Rothschild Island, Antarctica
 Mirny Rupes, a mountain chain on planet Mercury
 Mirnyy (village), a small village located in Kostroma Oblast, Russia
 Mirny (Kazakhstan), a mining town in East Kazakhstan

Other 
 Mirny (sloop-of-war), a ship of the First Russian Antarctic Expedition in 1819–1821
 Mir mine (Mirny mine), an abandoned open pit diamond mine in the Sakha Republic, Russia
 Mirny Station, a Russian research station in Antarctica
 1610 Mirnaya, a main-belt asteroid

See also
 
 List of places named after peace
 Mir (disambiguation)
 Mirninsky (disambiguation)